Yaroslavsky District is the name of several administrative and municipal districts in Russia:
Yaroslavsky District, Moscow, a district in North-Eastern Administrative Okrug of Moscow
Yaroslavsky District, Yaroslavl Oblast, an administrative and municipal district of Yaroslavl Oblast

See also
Yaroslavsky (disambiguation)

References